Lilla Märta kommer tillbaka or Grevinnans snedsteg eller Den vilda jakten efter det hemliga dokumentet  (English: Little Märta Comes Back or The Countess slip or The Wild Hunt for the Secret Document) is a 1948 Swedish comedy film directed by Hasse Ekman and starring Stig Järrel and Hasse Ekman.

Plot summary  
Sture Letterström and Kurre Svensson take on the task of rescuing a secret document during World War II from a group of Swedish Nazis. Since both of them are known by the local Nazis, Sture again has to take on the role of Miss Märta Letterström, and Kurre also has to make use of his feminine side as well as a dress.

Cast 
Stig Järrel as Sture Letterström/Ms. Märta Letterström
Hasse Ekman as Curt "Kurre" Svensson/Ms. Elvira Pettersson 
Hugo Jacobson as Pontus Bruzell 
Tollie Zellman as Tora, his wife
Brita Borg as Inga Bruzell, Pontus and Toras daughter
Sten Larsson as doctor Gotthard Vogel, nazi 
Douglas Håge as Peter Sonne, f.d. Pettersson, nazi 
Charlie Almlöf as Charles-Emile Högquist
Benkt-Åke Benktsson as doktor Bauerbrecht, nazi
Hjördis Petterson as Fräulein Schultze, nazi
Ernst Brunman as police Karlsson, nazi
Gunnar Björnstrand as captain
Harald Emanuelsson as the captains chauffeur
Margit Andelius as Ms. Synnergren, teacher, nazi

External links

References

1948 films
Films directed by Hasse Ekman
1948 comedy films
1940s Swedish-language films
Swedish comedy films
Swedish black-and-white films
Swedish World War II films
1940s Swedish films